Thalassa is a genus of lady beetles in the  family Coccinellidae. There are at least six described species in Thalassa.

Species
These species belong to the genus Thalassa:
 Thalassa flaviceps Mulsant, 1850
 Thalassa glauca (Mulsant, 1850)
 Thalassa korschefskyi Milleo, 2004
 Thalassa montezumae Mulsant, 1850 (Montezuma lady beetle)
 Thalassa pentaspilota (Chevrolat, 1853)
 Thalassa saginata
 Thalassa similaris Mulsant, 1850

References

Further reading

 
 

Coccinellidae
Coccinellidae genera
Articles created by Qbugbot